Arab Lang (also Romanized as ‘Arab Lang and ‘Arab-e Lang; also known as Palang Dezh) is a village in Zu ol Faqr Rural District, Sarshiv District, Saqqez County, Kurdistan Province, Iran. At the 2006 census, its population was 266, in 56 families. The village is populated by Kurds.

References 

Towns and villages in Saqqez County
Kurdish settlements in Kurdistan Province